Julius Rudel (6 March 1921 – 26 June 2014) was an  Austrian-born American opera and orchestra conductor. He was born in Vienna and was a student at the city's Academy of Music. He emigrated to the United States at the age of 17 in 1938 after the country was annexed by Germany.

He studied conducting at the Mannes College of Music in New York City. After completing his music studies, he joined the New York City Opera. He died on 26 June 2014 at the age of 93.

Professional career
New York City Opera

After 1944, he began a 35-year career with that company which continued until 1979. After rising to Principal Conductor and General Director in 1957, he brought the company international acclaim with his innovative programming (including three seasons of all-American operas in 1958, 1959, and 1960), and formed a partnership with Beverly Sills, who became the leading soprano of the NYCO. He led the company to its new home at the New York State Theater in Lincoln Center, where it opened in February 1966 with Alberto Ginastera's Don Rodrigo, in which he cast an unknown 25-year-old tenor, Plácido Domingo.

Buffalo Philharmonic Orchestra

In 1979, he accepted the position of Music Director of the Buffalo Philharmonic Orchestra, succeeding Michael Tilson Thomas, and led that orchestra through the 1985 season.

Other positions

Rudel conducted major orchestras and operas throughout the world. Between 1958 and 1963 he conducted frequently for the Philadelphia Lyric Opera Company, also serving as the company's Artistic Director for part of that time. In 1978, he first conducted at the Metropolitan Opera, making his debut with Werther. He also won a Grammy Award.

He was the first Music Director of both Washington's Kennedy Center and the Wolf Trap Opera Company, and from 1962 to 1976 he was Music Director of the Caramoor Festival.

He was a National Patron of Delta Omicron, an international professional music fraternity.

In 2009 he was honored by the US National Endowment for the Arts for his many contributions to opera. He died in Manhattan on 26 June 2014.

Recordings

Audio

 Floyd: The Sojourner and Mollie Sinclair (Neway, Treigle; 1963) [live] VAI
 Handel: Giulio Cesare (Sills, Wolff, Forrester, Treigle; 1967) RCA Victor
 Ginastera: Bomarzo (Novoa; 1967) Columbia Records
 Massenet: Manon (Sills, Gedda, Souzay, Bacquier; 1970) Westminster
 Offenbach: Les contes d'Hoffmann (Sills, Marsee, Burrows, Treigle; 1972) Westminster
 Donizetti: Anna Bolena (Sills, Verrett, Burrows, Plishka; 1972) Westminster
 Bellini: I puritani (Sills, Gedda, L.Quilico, Plishka; 1973) Westminster
 Boito: Mefistofele (Caballé, Domingo, Treigle; 1973) EMI
 Massenet: Thaïs (Moffo, Carreras, Bacquier, Díaz; 1974) RCA

 Charpentier: Louise (Sills, Gedda, van Dam; 1977) EMI
 Lehár: Die lustige Witwe: excerpts (Sills, H.Price, Titus; 1978) EMI
 Massenet: Cendrillon (Welting, von Stade, Gedda; 1978) CBS
 Verdi: Rigoletto (Sills, Kraus, Milnes, Ramey; 1978) EMI
 Weill: Der Silbersee (Grey; 1980) Nonesuch

Video

 Donizetti: Roberto Devereux (Sills, Marsee, J.Alexander, Fredricks; Capobianco, 1975) [live] VAI
 Verdi: La traviata (Sills, H.Price, Fredricks; Capobianco, 1976) [live] VAI
 Massenet: Manon (Sills, H.Price, Fredricks, Ramey; Capobianco, 1977) [live] Paramount
 Saint-Saëns: Samson et Dalila (Verrett, Domingo, Brendel; Joël, 1981) [live] Kultur
 Giordano: Andrea Chénier (Tomowa-Sintow, Domingo, Zancanaro; Hampe, 1985) [live] Kultur

See also
 Massenet: Cendrillon (Julius Rudel recording)
 Christmas with Flicka (television movie)

References 
Notes

Sources
Morgan, Brian (2006), Strange Child of Chaos: Norman Treigle iUniverse, 2006. 
Rudel, Julius; Rebecca Paller (2013), First and Lasting Impressions: Julius Rudel Looks Back on a Life in Music. University of Rochester Press.

External links

 Duffie, Bruce, Interview with Julius Rudel, 1 November 1982 (Published in the "Massenet Newsletter" in July 1983)
 National Endowment for the Arts Opera Honors, 2009: Julius Rudel on nea.gov/honors
 Rudel biography on Buffalo Philharmonic's website at buffalo.edul 
 Stevenson, John, [ Artist Biography on allmusic.com]

1921 births
2014 deaths
American conductors (music)
American male conductors (music)
Jewish emigrants from Austria to the United States after the Anschluss
Jewish American musicians
Jewish classical musicians
Grammy Award winners
Mannes School of Music alumni
Musicians from Vienna
21st-century American Jews